The Mermaid Theatre was a theatre encompassing the site of Puddle Dock and Curriers' Alley at Blackfriars in the City of London, and the first built in the City since the time of Shakespeare. It was, importantly, also one of the first new theatres to abandon the traditional stage layout; instead a single tier of seats surrounded the stage on three sides.

History
The 20th-century theatre was the life's work of actor Bernard Miles with his wife, Josephine Wilson. His original Mermaid Theatre was a large barn at his house in the St. John's Wood area of London. This seated 200 people, and during 1951 and 1952 was used for concerts, plays and a celebrated opera production of Dido and Aeneas with Kirsten Flagstad, Maggie Teyte and Thomas Hemsley, conducted by Geraint Jones, which was recorded by HMV. For the third season in 1953 the Mermaid Theatre was moved to the Royal Exchange.

Miles was encouraged to build a permanent theatre and, raising money from public subscriptions, and his revenues from publicity spots for the Egg Marketing Board; he oversaw the creation of the new building on land formerly occupied by a warehouse. This site was close to the location of an abortive attempt, in the Jacobean era, to build a theatre (named Porter's Hall) for the amalgamation of the Children of the Queen's Revels and Lady Elizabeth's Men. This project, undertaken by Philip Rosseter with distant backing from Henslowe and Alleyn, was ended because of complaints from the neighbourhood's residents.

The new Mermaid Theatre opened on 28 May 1959 with a successful production of Lock Up Your Daughters and it was the venue for many other very successful productions, such as Cowardy Custard (often cited as responsible for the revival of interest in Noël Coward's works) and including an annual staging of Treasure Island, with Miles reprising his role of Long John Silver, which he also played in a television version. The Mermaid Theatre also ran the Molecule Club, educating children about science.

In July 1961 the poet and author Sylvia Plath read her poem "Tulips" at the Poetry at the Mermaid Festival, sponsored by the Arts Council of Great Britain. The programme notes that there were twelve commissioned poets at the festival, one of whom was Plath's husband, Ted Hughes.

Other notable productions include the 1978 première of Whose Life Is It Anyway?, with Tom Conti and Rona Anderson.  The Royal Shakespeare Company sometimes transferred Stratford productions to the Mermaid, including a residency during 1987 which saw the staging of seven plays.

Gomba Holdings, a property company owned by Ugandan Asian businessman Abdul Shamji and his family, which claimed to have interests in the Garrick and Duchess theatres as well as Wembley Stadium, bought the theatre in the mid-1980s in the hope of redeveloping the Puddle Dock site. Bernard Miles' tenure as honorary artistic advisor was abruptly terminated and the theatre's importance declined. In 1989, Abdul Shamji was sentenced to 15 months in prison over his involvement in the Johnson Matthey bank collapse. Josephine Wilson died in 1990 and Bernard (by then Lord) Miles died in 1991, financially destitute.

Marc Sinden was appointed artistic director in 1993, opening the Bernard Miles Studio as a second performance area, but left the next year. Actor Roy Marsden and Vanessa Ford took over the running of the theatre for a few months prior to its eventual closure and the termination of the Shamji family's ownership.

After a further change of ownership the theatre was slated for demolition in 2002 as part of redevelopment plans. Already it had fallen into disuse, the buildings being used more often as a conference centre than a theatre. A preservation campaign by actors and other supporters attempted to reverse the decision. In April 2003 Ken Livingstone, the Mayor of London, ordered the council to block the demolition. As of March 2005 new plans had been submitted for the redevelopment of the site. Nothing materialised and the building continued to operate primarily as a conference centre. The BBC Concert Orchestra used it for occasional concerts, and the BBC recorded a popular weekly radio show, Friday Night is Music Night that showcased musicians such as the violinist Nigel Kennedy and singer Josh Groban. In 2006, music duo Pet Shop Boys played a mid-length set accompanied by the BBC Concert Orchestra and special guests including Robbie Williams, Francis Barber and Rufus Wainwright which was musically directed by Trevor Horn. The show was documented on the audio release entitled Concrete.

Loss of theatre status, and redevelopment plans
In September 2008, the Corporation of London City Planning Committee, against the advice of the Theatres Trust and noted actors, producers and artistic directors, granted a certificate that stripped the former playhouse of its theatre status. The move may save the developer £6 million worth of Section 106 funding which it had previously agreed to pay in lieu if it closed the 600-seat Mermaid; the company could be released from the obligation because no theatrical productions have taken place for more than ten years. The existing plans would see the Puddle Dock building converted into a conference centre and fitness suite, plus offices, a nightclub and retail and restaurant space. Campaigners were concerned that the entire building might be demolished. The former chairman of the Save London's Theatres Campaign, John Levitt, called the decision “a tragedy” and “sheer meanness”.

In 2021, the Mermaid Theatre still exists as a conference centre, called The Mermaid London.

See also
Mermaid Theatre of Nova Scotia

References

External links
The Mermaid Conference & Events Centre
The Theatres Trust

Article from March 2005

Theatres in the City of London
Theatres completed in 1959
Blackfriars, London